Akshay Kodoth (born 20 March 1992) is an Indian cricketer who played for Kerala in domestic cricket.

Early life
Akshay was born in Kollam and was brought up in Bengaluru were his father Gopalkrishna worked. He attended the Roger Binny Cricket Academy as a 10-year old.

He studied Bcom at Jain University, Bengaluru were he was teammates with K. L. Rahul, Karun Nair and Manish Pandey.

Career
Akshay first represented Kerala in U-17 level. He made his List A debut on 10 February 2010 in the Vijay Hazare Trophy. He scored 451 runs in six matches with a hundred and three half-centuries in the 2014 C. K. Nayudu Trophy while leading Kerala under-23 team to elite group semifinals. He made his first-class debut for Kerala on 17 November 2011 against Tripura in the 2011-12 Ranji Trophy. He has played for Mysuru Warriors in Karnataka Premier League.

On 2017, he signed to play for Ivanhoe. He signed to play for Camberwell Magpies Cricket Club on Premier League 2019-20.

References

External links
 

1992 births
Living people
Indian cricketers
Kerala cricketers
Sportspeople from Kollam
Cricketers from Kerala
Wicket-keepers